John Eager (1782–1853?) was an English organist.

Early life
Eager was born in 1782 in Norwich, where his father was a manufacturer of musical instruments. He learned the rudiments of music from his father, and made such progress that at the age of twelve he attracted the notice of the Duke of Dorset, who took him to Knowle as a page. Here he improved his education in the fine library, and probably acquired skill upon the violin, of which the duke was an amateur. Towards the end of the century his patron became insane, and Eager, for whose support no provision had been made, ran away to Yarmouth, where he proceeded to set up as a teacher of music. Soon afterwards he married Miss Barnby, a lady of good fortune, and in October 1803 was appointed organist to the corporation of Yarmouth on the death of John Roope.

Music teachings
In 1814 Johann Bernhard Logier patented his ‘chiroplast,’ an invention for holding the hands in a proper position while playing the pianoforte. This system of teaching was ardently taken up by Eager. The adherents of the new method were vehemently attacked by conservative musicians, and Eager came in for a full share of abuse in the Norfolk papers. He gradually convinced a considerable number of persons of the excellence of the system, which, in addition to the use of the chiroplast, professed to teach the ground work of harmony much more rapidly and thoroughly than any other method. Another of its peculiarities was that twelve or more of the pupils were required to play simultaneously on as many pianos. He opened a ‘musical academy for music and dancing,’ at the Assembly Rooms, Norwich, in the conduct of which he was assisted by his daughters. Public examinations were in due course held for the purpose of convincing the audience of the genuineness of the method.

On 18 June 1819, after the second of these examinations Eager published 'A Brief Account' with accompanying examples of what was actually done at the second examination of Mr. Eager's pupils educated upon Logier's system. This account was addressed to Major Peter Hawker and published by Hunter in St. Paul's Churchyard. The appendix to the account contains certain letters written to, but not published in, the ‘Norwich Mercury’ and the ‘Norfolk Chronicle’ by people who considered that the opinions on the chiroplast method expressed by those papers were unfair. Eager's reputation does not appear to have suffered; ten years afterwards he is spoken of in the highest terms by the writer of the ‘History of Norfolk,’ and then held the post of organist to the corporation.

Later life
In 1833 Eager left Norwich for Edinburgh, where he resided until his death about twenty years later. He separated from his wife, by whom he had two daughters, Mrs. Bridgman and Mrs. Lowe, before leaving England; obtained a Scotch divorce about 1839, and afterwards married a Miss Lowe, sister of his second daughter's husband. He wrote pianoforte sonatas, and some songs and glees of no importance.

References

1782 births
1853 deaths
English organists
British male organists
19th-century organists
Musicians from Norwich
English composers
19th-century English musicians
19th-century British male musicians